ATP-binding cassette transporter sub-family C member 8 is a protein that in humans is encoded by the ABCC8 gene. ABCC8 orthologs have been identified in all mammals for which complete genome data are available.

The protein encoded by this gene is a member of the superfamily of ATP-binding cassette (ABC) transporters. ABC proteins transport various molecules across extra- and intra-cellular membranes. ABC genes are divided into seven distinct subfamilies (ABC1, MDR/TAP, MRP, ALD, OABP, GCN20, White). This protein is a member of the MRP subfamily which is involved in multi-drug resistance. This protein functions as a modulator of ATP-sensitive potassium channels and insulin release. Mutations and deficiencies in this protein have been observed in patients with hyperinsulinemic hypoglycemia of infancy, an autosomal recessive disorder of unregulated and high insulin secretion. Mutations have also been associated with non-insulin-dependent diabetes mellitus type II (neonatal diabetes), an autosomal dominant disease of defective insulin secretion. Alternative splicing of this gene has been observed; however, the transcript variants have not been fully described.

See also
 ATP-binding cassette transporter
 Sulfonylurea receptor

References

External links
  GeneReviews/NCBI/NIH/UW entry on Familial Hyperinsulinism
  GeneReviews/NCBI/NIH/UW entry on Permanent Neonatal Diabetes Mellitus

Further reading

ATP-binding cassette transporters